High Noon is a 1952 western film directed by Fred Zinnemann.

High Noon may also refer to:

 High noon, a synonym for solar noon

Arts and entertainment
 High Noon, Part II: The Return of Will Kane, a 1980 TV film sequel to High Noon 
 High Noon (2000 film), an American television film remake of the 1952 film
 High Noon (2009 film), directed by Peter Markle
 High Noon (2013 film), directed by Ivan Mazza
 High Noon (painting), a 1949 painting by Edward Hopper
 High Noon (video game), a 1984 shoot 'em up game for the Commodore 64 by Ocean Software
 "High Noon" (Gargoyles), a 1995 episode of the Disney animated show Gargoyles
 Chikara High Noon, a 2011 professional wrestling pay-per-view event produced by Chikara

Music
 High Noon (Mark Heard album), 1993
 High Noon (Arkells album), 2014
 High Noon (Jerrod Niemann album), 2014
 "High Noon", a song by Haircut 100 from their 1984 album Paint and Paint
 "High Noon", a 1993 song by Kruder & Dorfmeister
 "High Noon", a 1997 single by DJ Shadow
 "High Noon", a song by Rascalz from their 1999 album Global Warning

See also
 "The Ballad of High Noon", the title theme from the  1952 film